The taralila is a type of hexagonal concertina played in Malagasy music.

Malagasy musical instruments
Free reed aerophones